Subin Tipmanee() is a Thai boccia player who represented Thailand at the 2016 Summer Paralympics. She, along with her 3 teammates, won a gold medal in Boccia in the Mixed Team BC1–2 event.

References

Living people
Subin Tipmanee
Boccia players at the 2016 Summer Paralympics
Subin Tipmanee
Medalists at the 2016 Summer Paralympics
Medalists at the 2020 Summer Paralympics
Place of birth missing (living people)
Paralympic medalists in boccia
Boccia players at the 2020 Summer Paralympics
Subin Tipmanee
1982 births
Subin Tipmanee